Michi Gaigg (born in Schörfling am Attersee, 1957) is an Austrian violinist and conductor. She is founder and conductor of the Baroque orchestras L'arpa festante and L'Orfeo.

Discography
 Georg Philipp Telemann (1681-1767): Orpheus, 2CDs Dorothee Mields, Ulrike Hofbauer, Christian Zenker, L'Orfeo Barockorchester, Michi Gaigg
 Joseph Haydn (1732-1809): Die wüste Insel (German Version of "L'isola disabitata"), 1CD Ulrike Hofbauer, Barbara Kraus, Christian Zenker, L'Orfeo Barockorchester, Michi Gaigg
Wolfgang Amadeus Mozart (1756-1791): Betulia liberata, 2 super audio CD Margot Oitzinger, Christian Zenker and others, L'Orfeo Barockorchester, Michi Gaigg

References

External links
 L'Orfeo Barockorchester

Women conductors (music)
Austrian violinists
1957 births
Living people
People from Vöcklabruck District
21st-century Austrian conductors (music)
21st-century violinists